The Queensland Railways 4D11½ Abt class locomotive was a class of 0-4-2T steam locomotives operated by the Queensland Railways.

History
In October 1898, two Dübs & Co locomotives entered service. Per Queensland Railway's classification system they were designated the 4D11½ Abt class, the 4 representing the number of driving wheels, the D that it was a tank locomotive, and the 11½ the cylinder diameter in inches.

They were built to assist conventional locomotives up and down a steeply graded rack railway section of the Central Western line at Mount Morgan.

Class list

References

Dübs locomotives
Rack and cog driven locomotives
Railway locomotives introduced in 1898
4D11
3 ft 6 in gauge locomotives of Australia
0-4-2T locomotives